Yarrowitch River, a perennial stream of the Macleay River catchment, is located in the Northern Tablelands district of New South Wales, Australia.

Course and features
Yarrowitch River rises within Mummel Gulf National Park on the northern slopes of the Great Dividing Range southwest of Yarrowitch, and flows generally north northeast, joined by the Warnes River before reaching its confluence with the Apsley River, southwest of Tia. The river descends  over its  course; spilling over the Yarrowitch Falls in the Oxley Wild Rivers National Park.

In its middle reaches, the Yarrowitch River passes through rich grazing country used for rearing livestock, principally beef cattle.

See also

 List of rivers of Australia
 Rivers of New South Wales

References

External links
 

Rivers of New South Wales
Northern Tablelands